Srinagar colony is an important commercial and residential area in the western part of Hyderabad, Telangana, India. It formed Ward No. 104 of Greater Hyderabad Municipal Corporation in 2009.

Because the area is close to Madhapur, with many working software professionals, it is a popular residential area, with a growing number of higher-valued flats. The area has also seen a large increase in real estate prices in recent years.

Commercial area
There are many banks, supermarkets and restaurants located in this suburb. There are many software companies which have made Srinagar colony their base. Many malls and theatres like Hyderabad Central, PVR Cinemas, Big Bazaar (Big Cinemas), Cinemax, and GVK One (Inox) are within 1 to 2 km distance. Ameerpet is very close, which is a major shopping center also a capital of Software training. Most of them have made Srinagar colony their residence.

Residential area
Srinagar Colony of Hyderabad is a posh suburban neighbourhood to the west of Hyderabad, Telangana. It is one of the best residential location in the city with rental prices up to Rs.60,000.00 for a three-bedroom flat (furnished flats rent for up to Rs.70,000.00). Most building in the area are five floors, with lot of small parks along the road. Ganapathi Complex is very famous meeting place for television stars. This landmark is known for its many artists of cinema and television stars.

Transport
The buses run by TSRTC connect Srinagar colony to all parts of the city. There is also a mini-bus service called as Setwin service. The closest MMTS Train station is at Begumpet, while the closest Metro station is at Yousufguda and Ameerpet.

Reference 

Neighbourhoods in Hyderabad, India